Dmitriyevsky District is an administrative and municipal district (raion), one of the twenty-eight in Kursk Oblast, Russia. It is located in the northwest of the oblast. Its administrative center is the town of Dmitriyev. Population:  22,420 (2002 Census);  The population of Dmitriyev accounts for 45.3% of the district's total population.

Geography
Dmitriyevsky District is located in the northwest of Kursk Oblast, on the border with Bryansk Oblast to the north.  The terrain is hilly plain dissected by ravines; there are 81 rivers and streams in the district, which lies on the Central Russian Upland.  The main river in the district is the Svapa River, which flows southwest into the Seym River.  The district is 65 km northwest of the city of Kursk, and 420 km southwest of Moscow  The area measures 51 km (north-south), and 53 km (west-east).  The administrative center is the town of Dmitriev.

The district is bordered on the north by Komarichsky District and Sevsky District of Bryansk Oblast, on the east by Zheleznogorsky District, on the south by Konyshyovsky District, and on the west by Khomutovsky District.

References

Notes

Sources

External links
Dmitriyevsky District on Google Maps
Dmitriyevsky District on OpenStreetMap

Districts of Kursk Oblast